"Fresh Eyes" is a song from American musician Andy Grammer, serving as the lead single from his third studio album The Good Parts. It was made available for digital download on July 29, 2016, through S-Curve Records. Grammer co-wrote the song with Ross Golan and Ian Kirkpatrick.

The song is a charity single with all proceeds going to the Union Rescue Mission in Los Angeles, a private Christian homeless shelter in downtown Los Angeles's Skid Row.

Composition
"Fresh Eyes" is written in the key of G major with a tempo of 126 beats per minute. The song follows a chord progression of Em-D-G-C, and Grammer's vocals span from D4 to G5.

Music video
A music video was filmed in Los Angeles in September 2016 and launched on October 19, 2016. It documents Grammer's visit to Union Rescue Mission where residents were given makeovers.

Live performances
Grammer performed "Fresh Eyes" on The Today Show on August 1, 2016.

Grammer also performed “Fresh Eyes” on NBC's New Year's Eve on December 31, 2018.

Charts

Weekly charts

Year-end charts

Certifications

Release history

References

2016 songs
2016 singles
Andy Grammer songs
Hollywood Records singles
Charity singles
Songs written by Ross Golan
Songs written by Ian Kirkpatrick (record producer)
Songs written by Andy Grammer
Song recordings produced by Ian Kirkpatrick (record producer)